Malda may refer to :

 Malda district in West Bengal state, northeastern India
 Malda, West Bengal, city in Malda district in West Bengal state, northeastern India
 Latin Catholic Apostolic Prefecture of Malda (former; renamed and promoted as Diocese of Dumka)
 Malda, Bihar, a village in West Champaran district in Bihar state, northeastern India
 Malda, Estonia, a village
 Maldà in Catalonia, Spain